The Isle of Man TT or Tourist Trophy races are an annual motorcycle racing event run on the Isle of Man in May/June of most years since its inaugural race in 1907. The event is often called one of the most dangerous racing events in the world as many competitors have died.

Overview
The Isle of Man TT is run in a time-trial format on public roads closed to the public by an Act of Tynwald. The event consists of one week of practice sessions followed by one week of racing. It has been a tradition, perhaps started by racing competitors in the early 1920s, for spectators to tour the Snaefell Mountain Course on motorcycles during the Isle of Man TT on Mad Sunday, an informal and unofficial sanctioned event held on the Sunday between Practice Week and Race Week.

The first Isle of Man TT race was held on Tuesday 28 May 1907 and was called the International Auto-Cycle Tourist Trophy. The event was organised by the Auto-Cycle Club over 10 laps of the Isle of Man St John's Short Course of 15 miles 1,470 yards for road-legal 'touring' motorcycles with exhaust silencers, saddles, pedals and mudguards.

The race programme developed from a single race with two classes for the 1907 Isle of Man TT, expanding in 1911 to two individual races for the 350cc Junior TT motor-cycles and the Blue Riband event the 500cc Senior TT race. The race did not take place from 1915 to 1919 due to the First World War. It resumed in 1920. A 250cc Lightweight TT race was added to the Isle of Man TT programme in 1922, followed by a Sidecar TT race in 1923.

There was no racing on the Isle of Man between 1940 and 1945 due to the Second World War. It recommenced with the Manx Grand Prix in 1946 and the Isle of Man TT in 1947, with a greatly expanded format that included the new Clubman's TT races. The Isle of Man TT became part of the FIM Motor-cycle Grand Prix World Championship (now MotoGP) as the British round of the World Motor-Cycling Championship during the period 1949–1976. Following safety concerns with the Snaefell Mountain Course and problems over inadequate "start-money" for competitors, there was a boycott of the Isle of Man TT races from the early 1970s by many of the leading competitors, motorcycle manufacturers and national motorcycle sporting federations.

It is regarded as the most dangerous motorsport event in the world; The New York Times said in 2017 that the number of deaths had risen "to 146 since it was first run in 1907; if one includes fatal accidents occurring during the Manx Grand Prix ... the figure rises above 250". An account of the 2003 race by Sports Illustrated writer Franz Lidz called the TT "a test of nerves and speed that may be sports' most dangerous event."

In 1976, the Isle of Man TT lost its world championship status; this was transferred to the United Kingdom by the FIM and run as the British Grand Prix for the 1977 season. The Isle of Man TT Races then became an integral part of the new style TT Formula 1, Formula 2 and Formula 3 World Championships between 1977 and 1990 to develop and maintain the international racing status of the Isle of Man TT races.

The event was redeveloped by the Isle of Man Department of Tourism as the Isle of Man TT Festival from 1989 onwards. This included new racing events for the new Isle of Man TT Festival programme, including the Pre-TT Classic Races in 1989 followed by the Post-TT Races from 1991, both held on the Billown Circuit. In 2013, the Isle of Man Classic TT was developed by the Isle of Man Department of Economic Development and the Auto-Cycle Union for historic racing motorcycles, and along with the Manx Grand Prix now forms part of the 'Isle of Man Festival of Motorcycling' held in late August of each year.

There has been criticism of the event. In 2007, an incident during the Senior Race resulted in the deaths of a rider and two spectators. The resultant inquest made several recommendations and included several comments, such as: 'Senior Marshals may well have been elevated beyond the sphere of their competence'.  The coroner also noted that "I am more than aware of the fact that the witnesses from the Manx Motor Cycle Club and the marshals are all volunteers. They give their time freely and without paid reward. Having said that however, if it were suggested because they were volunteers there should be some allowance in the standards expected of them, then I regret I cannot agree."

In 2018, a solo competitor was seriously injured during a head-on collision with an official Course Car being driven at high speed when conveying police officers to officiate at the scene of a fatality further along the course. He was one of seven riders who had been halted on the course and turned back by marshals, being instructed to proceed back to the paddock area in the reverse-direction after the red flag stoppage.

The 2020 and 2021 TT races were cancelled because of the COVID-19 pandemic.

Early Isle of Man TT race history (1904–1910)

Gordon Bennett and Tourist Trophy car races
Motor racing began on the Isle of Man in 1904 with the Gordon Bennett Eliminating Trial, restricted to touring automobiles. The Highways (Light Locomotive) Act 1904 gave permission in the Isle of Man for the  Highroads Course for the 1904 Gordon Bennett Eliminating Trial which was won by Clifford Earl (Napier) in 7 hours 26.5 minutes for five laps of the Highroads Course. The 1905 Gordon Bennett Trial was held on 30 May 1905 and was again won by Clifford Earl driving a Napier automobile in 6 hours and 6 minutes for six laps of the Highroads Course.

International Motor-Cycle Cup Race (1905)
For the 1905 Gordon Bennett Eliminating Trial it was decided to run an eliminating trial for motorcycles the day afterwards for a team to represent Great Britain in the International Motor-Cycle Cup Races. An accident at Ramsey Hairpin forced out one of the pre-race favourites, and the inability of the competitors to climb the steep Mountain Section of the course forced the organisers to use a  section of the Gordon Bennett Trial course. This ran from Douglas south to Castletown and then north to Ballacraine along the primary A3 road and returning to the start at the Quarterbridge in Douglas via Crosby and Glen Vine along the current Snaefell Mountain Course in the reverse direction.

Format of the races

The TT Races since the first race in 1907 have been in the format of time-trial. The races held on the Clypse Course during the period 1954–1959 were the more traditional full grid starts along with the 1924 Lightweight TT Race and Clubmen TT Races from 1948, which were also "mass-start" races. The current format is a "clutch start" and race competitors will be "started singly at 10-second intervals".

Race procedure
 Start Preliminaries
First Signal – 45 minutes before the start with a warm-up of engines in the Race Paddock and assembly area.
Second Signal – 30 minutes before start.
Third Signal – 15 minutes before start, race competitors move to the start-line and form-up in qualification order.
Fourth Signal – 5 minutes before start, signal to clear the grid and race competitors move towards the exit-gate.

Eligibility
Entrants must be in possession of a valid National Entrants or FIM Sponsors Licence for Road Racing.

Entrants must also cite pre-filled documentation of completion of a UK driver's licence or motorcycle certification, or a driver's licence from a comparable country that is recognised by UK comparable department of transportation standards and may withhold due to any pre race or post race suspensions.

Race classes

 Current

 Senior TT (1909–present)
 Lightweight TT (1922–1976, 1995–2004, 2012–present)
 Junior TT / Supersport TT (1911–present)
 Superbike TT (2005–present)
 Superstock TT (2005–present)
 Sidecar TT (1923–1925, 1951–1967, 1977–present)

 Former

 Singles TT (1907–1908, 1994–2000)
 Twin TT (1907–1908)
 Sidecar 1000 TT (1975–1976)
 Sidecar 750 TT (1968–1974)
 Sidecar 500 TT (1968–1976)
 Ultra-Lightweight TT (1924–1925, 1951–1974, 1989–2004, 2008)
 Clubman Senior TT (1947–1956)
 Clubman Junior TT (1947–1956)
 Clubman Lightweight TT (1947–1950)
 Clubman 1000 TT (1949–1950, 1953)
 50 TT (1962–1968)
 Classic TT (1975–1984)
 Formula 1 TT (1977–2004)
 Formula 2 TT (1977–1987)
 Formula 3 TT (1977–1982)
 Production 1500 TT (1985–1985)
 Production 1000 TT (1974, 2002–2004)
 Production 750 TT (1967–1973, 1984–1985)
 Production 500 / 600 TT (1967–1974, 2002–2004)
 Production 250 TT (1967–1974, 1984–1985)
 Production TT (1975–1976, 1996–2000)
 Production A TT (1986–1988)
 Production B TT (1986–1988)
 Production C TT (1986–1988)
 Production D TT (1986–1988)
 Supersport 600 TT (1989–1994)
 Supersport 400 TT (1989–1994)
 Lightweight 400 TT (1999–2004)
 TTXGP (2009)
 TT Zero (2010–2019)

Superbike TT
The 2015 specification for entries into the Superbike TT race are defined as:
 Any machine complying with the following specifications:
 TT Superbike: (Machines complying with the 2015 FIM Superbike Championship specifications)
 Over 750 cc up to 1000 cc 4 cylinders 4-stroke
 Over 750 cc up to 1000 cc 3 cylinders 4-stroke
 Over 850 cc up to 1200 cc 2 cylinders 4-stroke
Minimum Weight . Other machines admitted at the discretion of the Organisers

Supersport TT
The 1911 Isle of Man TT was the first time the Junior TT race took place, open to 300 cc single-cylinder and 340 cc twin cylinder motorcycles, contested over five laps of the new  Snaefell Mountain Course. The 1912 event was the first to limit the Junior TT to only 350 cc machines and this engine capacity prevailed until 1976, after which the category was dropped. The event was instead run for 250 cc machines until 1994 when replaced by the 600 cc Supersport class.

 1911 For single cylinder motorcycles not exceeding 300 cc engine capacity and 340 cc twin cylinder motorcycles.
 1912–1948 For motorcycles not exceeding 350 cc engine capacity.
 1949–1953 FIM World Championship event for motorcycles not exceeding 350 cc engine capacity and held on the Snaefell mountain course.
 1954–1959 FIM World Championship event for motorcycles not exceeding 350 cc engine capacity and held on the Clypse Course.
 1960–1976 FIM World Championship event for motorcycles not exceeding 350 cc engine capacity and held on the Mountain Course.
 1977–1994 for motorcycles not exceeding 250 cc engine capacity and held on the Mountain Course.
 1995 onwards for motorcycles not exceeding 600 cc engine capacity and held on the Mountain Course.

The 2015 specifications for entries into the Supersport TT race are:
 TT Supersport: (Machines complying with the 2015 FIM Supersport Championship specifications)

 Over 400 cc up to 600 cc 4 cylinders 4-stroke
 Over 600 cc up to 675 cc 3 cylinders 4-stroke
 Over 600 cc up to 750 cc 2 cylinders 4-stroke

Minimum Weight 161 kg

Superstock TT

The 2015 specifications for entries for the Superstock TT, an event for production based motorcycles racing with treaded road tyres, are based on the FIM Superstock Championship specifications, as follows:
 Superstock TT: (Machines complying with the 2012 FIM Superstock Championship specifications)
 Over 750 cc up to 1000 cc 4 cylinders 4-stroke
 Over 750 cc up to 1000 cc 3 cylinders 4-stroke
 Over 850 cc up to 1200 cc 2 cylinders 4-stroke
Minimum (Dry) Weight 170 kg

Lightweight TT

In the changes following the loss of FIM World Championship status after the 1976 event, the Lightweight TT event was dropped with the 250 cc machines running for the Junior TT in place of the now defunct 350 cc formula. The Lightweight TT returned in 1995 before being split into two distinct events from 1999, dropping from the schedule again after 2003. As with the Ultra-Lightweight TT Race, it was reintroduced 2008–2009 when held on the Billown short road circuit and then dropped again from the race schedule on cost grounds.

 1924–1948 For motorcycles not exceeding 250 cc engine capacity.
 1949–1953 FIM World Championship event for motorcycles not exceeding 250 cc engine capacity, held on the Snaefell mountain course.
 1954–1959 FIM World Championship event for motorcycles not exceeding 250 cc engine capacity, held on the Clypse Course.
 1960–1976 FIM World Championship event for motorcycles not exceeding 250 cc engine capacity, held on the Mountain Course.
 1977–1994 event not run (250 cc formula run as Junior TT).
 1995–1998 for 2-stroke motorcycles not exceeding 250 cc engine capacity and 4-stroke motorcycles not exceeding 400 cc, held on the Mountain Course.
 1999–2003 Lightweight 400 TT for 4-stroke motorcycles not exceeding 400 cc engine capacity, held on the Mountain Course.
 1999–2002 Lightweight 250 TT for 2-stroke motorcycles not exceeding 250 cc engine capacity, held on the Mountain Course (the category running within Junior TT in 2003).
 2008–2009 for motorcycles not exceeding 250 cc engine capacity, held on the Billown Circuit.
 2012– The event was re-introduced from the 2012 event for water-cooled four-stroke twin cylinder not exceeding an engine capacity of 650 cc and complying with the ACU Standing Regulations.

The 2019 specifications for entries into the Lightweight TT race are:
 Machines must comply with general technical rules as per ACU Standing Regulations and 2019 Isle of Man TT race regulations.
 Any four-stroke twin cylinder motorcycle originally sold for road use with a water-cooled engine of up to 650 cc engine capacity.
 Eligible machines must be from models homologated for UK road use 2009 or later.

Sidecar TT

For the 1926 event the Sidecar and Ultra-Lightweight TT classes were dropped due to lack of entries.

The Sidecar race was re-introduced from the 1954 event for Sidecars not exceeding 500 cc engine capacity, run on the Clypse Course. A non-championship 750 cc class for sidecars was introduced at the 1968 event. For the 1976 event the race was held over two-legs. From 1975, the previous 500 cc and 750 cc classes for Sidecars were replaced by a 1000 cc engine capacity class.

The new FIM Formula 2 class for Sidecars was introduced for the 1990 Isle of Man TT.

 1954–1959 FIM World Championship Event for Side-Cars not exceeding 500 cc engine capacity. Race held on the Clypse Course.
 1960–1976 FIM World Championship Event held on Mountain Course.
 1968–1974 Non-Championship event for Sidecars not exceeding 750 cc.
 1975–1989 Sidecars not exceeding 1000 cc engine capacity.
 1990– FIM Formula 2 Sidecar race for two-stroke engines not exceeding 350 cc or four-stroke engines not exceeding 600 cc.

The 2015 specifications for entries into the Sidecar TT race are:
 Machines must comply with general technical rules as per ACU Standing Regulations and 2015 Isle of Man TT regulations.
 Engine Types
501 – 600 cc, 4 stroke, 4 cylinder, Production based motorcycle engines.

Senior TT

For the 1911 Isle of Man TT, the first TT event using the Snaefell Mountain Course or Mountain Course, two separate races were introduced. The first event was a four lap Junior TT race and a separate Senior TT race for 500 cc single-cylinder and 585 cc twin-cylinder motorcycles, over five laps of the new  Snaefell Mountain Course. The new technical challenges of the Mountain Course forced changes on entrants and motorcycle manufacturers alike. The American Indian motorcycle factory fitted a two-speed gearbox and chain-drive. Fitted with a six-speed belt drive Charlie Collier riding a Matchless motorcycle finished second in the 1911 Senior TT race and was later disqualified for illegal refuelling. During an early morning practice session for the 1911 Isle of Man TT races, Victor Surridge died after crashing his Rudge motorcycle at Glen Helen, the first death of a competitor on the Snaefell Mountain Course and the first death in the Isle of Man of a person in an automotive accident.

 1911 For single cylinder motorcycles not exceeding 500 cc engine capacity and 585 cc twin cylinder motorcycles.
 1912–1939 For motorcycles not exceeding 500 cc engine capacity.
 1947–1948 For motorcycles not exceeding 500 cc engine capacity and a ban on engine supercharging.
 1949–1976 FIM World Championship event for motorcycles not exceeding 500 cc engine capacity.
 1977–1984 for motorcycles not exceeding 500 cc engine capacity.
 1985–2004 for motorcycles complying with ACU TT Formula 1 rules not exceeding 1,010 cc engine capacity.
 2004 onwards for motorcycles complying with ACU/FIM Superbike rules not exceeding 1,000 cc engine capacity.

The 2015 specifications for entries into the Senior TT race are:
 TT Superbike: (Machines complying with the 2015 FIM Superbike Championship specifications)
 Over 750 cc up to 1000 cc 4 cylinders 4-stroke
 Over 750 cc up to 1000 cc 3 cylinders 4-stroke
 Over 850 cc up to 1200 cc 2 cylinders 4-stroke

Supersport Junior TT (without limitation of tyre choice)
 TT Superstock (without limitation of tyre choice)
 Other machines admitted at the discretion of the Organisers.

TT Zero

Starting from the 2010 races, the TT Zero event over one lap of the Snaefell Mountain Course replaced the TTXGP. The TT Zero event as an officially sanctioned TT race is for racing motorcycles where "The technical concept is for motorcycles (two wheeled) to be powered without the use of carbon based fuels and have zero toxic/noxious emissions". The Isle of Man Government offered a prize of £10,000 for the first entrant to exceed the prestigious  (22 minutes and 38.388 seconds) average speed around the Mountain Course. This was achieved by Michael Rutter of team MotoCzysz in the 2012 race, and has been exceeded every year since.

In 2019, a moratorium on further events in this class was announced, due to the slow take-up in electric motorcycles. Speaking about the future of the event, Enterprise Minister Alex Allinson has ruled out further competition in this class until at least 2024.

Discontinued race classes

Ultra-Lightweight TT

1924 was the first time the Ultra-Lightweight TT race took place for motorcycles not exceeding 175 cc engine capacity. The Ultra-Lightweight class was re-introduced in 1951 for motorcycles not exceeding 125 cc until discontinued in 1974, and then re-introduced for 1989, again for two-stroke 125 cc motorcycles, until dropped again due to lack of entries after 2004. The event was reintroduced 2008–2009 held on the four-mile Billown Circuit and then dropped from the race schedule on cost grounds for the 2010 races.

 1924–1925 For motorcycles not exceeding 175 cc engine capacity.
 1951–1953 FIM World Championship event for motorcycles not exceeding 125 cc engine capacity, held on the Snaefell mountain course.
 1954–1959 FIM World Championship event for motorcycles not exceeding 125 cc engine capacity, held on the Clypse Course.
 1960–1974 FIM World Championship event for motorcycles not exceeding 125 cc engine capacity, held on the Mountain Course.
 1989–2004 for motorcycles not exceeding 125 cc engine capacity, held on the Mountain Course.
 2008–2009 for motorcycles not exceeding 125 cc engine capacity, held on the Billown Circuit.

50 cc race 1962–1968, an additional World Championship event for Ultra-Lightweight motorcycles not exceeding 50 cc engine capacity, held on the Mountain Course.

Clubman TT and Production TT
The Clubman races with Lightweight, Junior and Senior classes were held for production motorcycles from 1947 until 1956. A Senior 1000 cc class provided an opportunity for Vincent motorcycles. The riders were little-known, but as the stars were barred from entering the class, it provided a stepping-stone for future-stars but resulted in less spectator-interest. The series became dominated by one model – the BSA Gold Star, and with little competition from other manufacturers, was discontinued. When previewing the impending re-introduction of a specification-controlled, roadster-based class in March 1967, David Dixon wrote: "lack of inter-make rivalry probably put the final nail in the coffin".

Writing in UK monthly magazine Motor Cyclist Illustrated, racing journalist Ray Knight, who had achieved a lap speed of nearly 88 mph on a Triumph Tiger 100 roadster-based racing motorcycle in the Manx Grand Prix, commented in early 1965 that the ACU had refused a request from manufacturers to run a production TT race, which he thought was a missed opportunity, particularly considering the dwindling support for the 500 cc race.

A Production TT for roadster-based motorcycles having classes for maximum engine capacities of 250 cc, 500 cc and 750 cc was introduced from 1967 until 1976 when the class was discontinued.

The Production TT was reintroduced for the 1984 races in three classes, reduced to two classes on safety grounds for the 1990 races. For the 2005 races the Superstock class replaced the previous 1000 cc and 600 cc Production TT classes that had been part of the race schedule since 1989.

TT course official vehicles
After the completion of a practice or race period, an official course vehicle displaying the notice Roads Open proceeds around the Mountain Course, passing each point opening the roads including side-access junctions to public use. On the Snaefell mountain road section from Ramsey to Douglas, the official vehicle displays the notice Roads Open One Way.

Travelling Marshals

Originally introduced in 1935, there are eight machines positioned around the course to
provide a rapid response to any incidents. Selected riders have previous race experience and are first-aid trained, with machines carrying medical equipment that can assist in managing a casualty. They also have other duties such as course inspection, observation of machines on the course for visible faults, and review and report any course incidents.

Crossing places during practice and races
The 1982 Road Racing Act (Isle of Man) and the supplementary TT Road Races Orders allow vehicles and pedestrians to cross the Snaefell Mountain Course at certain points between scheduled race periods under the supervision of a police officer. Several permanent pedestrian overbridges have been erected. These points include:

In Douglas 
 A2 St Ninian's Crossroads with the A22 Ballaquayle Road and the A22 Ballanard Road
 A2 junction at Bray Hill with the Tromode Road and Stoney Road
 A1 Peel Road between Braddan Bridge (Jubilee Oak) and the Quarterbridge
 A2 Governor's Road, Onchan, the A2 Glencrutchery Road and Victoria Road at Governor's Bridge
 A2 Glencrutchery Road between Second & Third Avenues and Victoria Road
 A18 Bemahague Road at Bedstead Corner, Onchan

Elsewhere
 A1 Douglas to Peel road with the A23 Eyreton Road and the B36 Old Church Road, Crosby
 A3 Castletown to Ramsey road junction with B10 Sartfield Road and the Ballaleigh Road at Barregarrow Crossroads, Michael
 A3 junction with A10 Station Road and C37 Ballaugh Glen Road at Ballaugh Bridge
 A3 junction with A14 Sandygate Road and A14 Tholt-y-Will Glen Road at Sulby Crossroads
 A2 Albert Square and Princes Road, Ramsey at the junction with A18 Snaefell Mountain Road, close to May Hill

TT Course access road

The TT Access Road runs parallel to a section of the A1 Peel Road, which is part of the Snaefell Mountain Course, and operates during practice and race periods to enable vehicles to pass from inside of the race course to the outside. It runs along a section of former railway line on the historic Douglas to Peel route, from the junction of the A5 New Castletown Road at the Quarter Bridge, passing under the course at Braddan Bridge, to an exit at Braddan School Road in Douglas outskirts, near the former Braddan Railway Halt and the A23/Ballafletcher Road junction. When used for vehicular traffic, pedestrian access is prohibited, but at other times it is part of a system of nature trails.

Safety

Between 1907 and 2022, there have been 155 fatalities during official practices or races on the Snaefell Mountain Course, and 265 total fatalities (this number includes the riders killed during the Manx Grand Prix, and Clubman TT race series of the late 1940s/1950s). In 2016, 5 riders died on the course during official practices or races. There were six fatalities among competitors in the 1970 Isle of Man TT, making it the deadliest year in the history of the event.

2018 Course Car incident

On 30 May 2018, an experienced TT rider, Steve Mercer, was seriously injured during a head-on collision with an official Course Car at Ballacrye. The car, being driven at high speed, was conveying police officers to officiate at the scene of a fatality involving Dan Kneen. Mercer was unconscious for five days and hospitalised for five months due to multiple injuries. He was one of seven riders who had been halted on the course and turned back by marshals, being instructed to proceed back to the TT Grandstand area in the reverse direction after the red flag stoppage. Immediately after the accident the organisers changed their protocols, requiring that returning riders must be controlled by motorcycle-mounted travelling marshals to the front and rear. An independent inquiry into the circumstances was arranged by ACU Events, the event organisers.

The Auto-Cycle Union, the Isle of Man Department for Enterprise, and the inquiry report author, lawyer Rob Jones, a former chief executive of the Motor Sports Association, all refused to release the report as it was confidential and privately owned by the ACU.

The ACU admitted liability for the accident, but instructed that any legal claim for compensation by Mercer must be filed in the Isle of Man. The ACU stated that Mercer was receiving financial assistance through its "extensive insurance arrangements".

In 2019, it was reported that the driver of the car in the collision had quit after criticism that he exceeded a newly introduced speed limit recorded by a GPS tracking device when he drove to attend a fatality involving Chris Swallow at Ballaugh in August's Senior Classic TT. Gary Thompson, Clerk of the Course and an ACU employee, had been criticised in 2018 for also fulfilling the role of Safety Officer; consequently a new incumbent was in place for 2019.

Cancellations

World Wars I and II
From 1915 to 1919, and 1940 to 1946, no TT events took place, due to the outbreak of World Wars I and II. Events continued from 1920 to 1939 and 1947 to 2000.

Since TT 1947, the Isle of Man TT has only been cancelled three times; 2001, 2020 and 2021, all of which were due to viral outbreaks.

2001 cancellation
The 2001 Isle of Man TT races were cancelled because of the outbreak of foot-and-mouth disease in the UK in the spring and summer of 2001. Disinfecting 40,000 spectators and competitors (and their motorcycles) to ensure the disease was kept off the island proved difficult.

2020 and 2021 cancellations
In March 2020, the Isle of Man Government announced the cancellation of the 2020 TT due to the ongoing COVID-19 pandemic. The Classic TT was subsequently cancelled in May, and in December 2020, it was announced that 2021's TT races would also not go ahead, due to the continued worldwide spread of the virus. In 2020, the Isle of Man Government lost an estimated £4.8 million of its annual projected revenue due to the cancellation of the TT races.

The event returned in 2022 after a two-year absence.

Total overall race winners

FIM Motorcycle Grand Prix World Championship Rounds (1949–1976)

The Isle of Man TT was part of the FIM Motorcycle Grand Prix World Championship (now MotoGP) between 1949 and 1976. During this period the Isle of Man TT Races counted as the United Kingdom round including the Sidecar TT, 50 cc Ultra-Lightweight TT, 125 cc Lightweight TT, 250 cc Lightweight TT, 350 cc Junior TT and 500 cc Senior TT races counted towards the FIM Motor-Cycle Grand Prix World Championship. After the 1972 races, multiple world champion and dominant motorcycle racer of his time Giacomo Agostini announced he would never race again at the Isle of Man, declaring it too dangerous for international competition and that it was outrageous that such a race should ever be part of a scenario professional riders were forced into; at this point the Isle of Man TT was not suited to the growing professionalism and business aspects of Grand Prix motorcycle racing. More and more riders joined his boycott, and after 1976 the race was stricken from the championship and replaced by the British Grand Prix.

Multiple winners (riders)

Multiple winners (manufacturers)

By year

Current lap records

Current race records

Race awards

Race winner trophies

  Marquis de Mouzilly St Mars Trophy.

Fastest lap awards

Special awards

Other Special awards
Fastest Newcomer – The Vernon Cooper Trophy
{| class="wikitable"
|-
! rowspan=2 |Rider(s)
!  rowspan=2 |Machine
!  rowspan=2 |Year
! colspan=2 |Average speed
! rowspan=2 | Time
|-
!mph
!km/h
|-
| Lukas Maurer || Kawasaki 1000 cc || 2019 ||  || 18:18.529
|-
|}

Most Meritorious Female – The Susan Jenness Trophy is awarded yearly by the Executive Committee of the TT Supporters' Club, in recognition of the "most meritorious performance by a female competitor" during the previous TT meeting.
{| class="wikitable"
|-
! Rider(s)
! Race Category
! Year
|-
| Jenny Tinmouth  || solo competitor || 2010
|-
| Fiona Baker-Milligan || as passenger, Sidecar 600 cc  || 2011
|-
| Debbie Baron  || as driver, Ireson Kawasaki Sidecar 600 cc || 2012
|-
| Estelle Leblond || as driver, Sidecar 600 cc || 2013
|-
| Estelle Leblond || as driver, Sidecar 600 cc || 2014
|-
| Fiona Baker-Milligan || as passenger, Sidecar 600 cc  || 2015
|-
| Maria Costello|| solo competitor  || 2016
|-
| Estelle Leblond & Melanie Farnier || Sidecar 600 cc || 2017
|-
| Julie Canipa || as passenger, Sidecar 600 cc  || 2018
|-
| (undecided)||  || 2019
|}

Video games

There have been numerous videogames based on the Isle of Man TT, the first being the 1995 Sega arcade game Manx TT Super Bike, which was later ported to the Sega Saturn in 1997. Several other games have followed since, including Suzuki TT Superbikes (2005), TT Superbikes: Real Road Racing Championship and TT Superbikes Legends (both 2008), all of which were released exclusively for the PlayStation 2, and developed by Jester Interactive.

Bigben Interactive has since revived the TT game license, releasing TT Isle Of Man: Ride on the Edge in 2018 and TT Isle Of Man: Ride on the Edge 2 in 2020.

See also

 List of named corners of the Snaefell Mountain Course
 North West 200
 Outline of motorcycles and motorcycling

Notes

Citations

References
 Barker, Stuart (2007). 100 One Hundred Years of the TT. EMAP 
 Duckworth, Mick (2007). TT 100 – The Authorised History of the Isle of Man Tourist Trophy Racing. Lily Publications 
 Harris, Nick (1991). Motocourse History of the Isle of Man Tourist Trophy Races 1907–1989 Hazelton Publishing 
 Mac McDiarmid (2004). The Magic of The TT. A Century of Racing over The Mountain Haynes Publishing. 
 Noyes, Denis (1999) 50 Years of Moto Grand Prix. Hazelton Publishing Ltd 
 Pidcock, Fred & Snelling, Bill (2007) History of the Isle of Man Clubman's TT Races 1947–1956. Amulree Publications 
 Savage, Mike (1997) TT Heroes. Amulree Publications 
 Snelling, Bill (1996). The Tourist Trophy in Old Photographs Collected by Bill Snelling. Sutton Publishing 
 Stroud, Jon (2007). The Little Book of the TT. Green Umbrella Publishing 
 Wright, David (2007). 100 Years of the Isle of Man TT Races. A Century of Motorcycle Racing. Crowood Press 
 Wright, David (2006). TT Topics and Tales. Amulree Publications

External links

  by IoM Department for Enterprise
 Route of Isle of Man TT (Google Maps)

 
1907 establishments in the Isle of Man
Recurring sporting events established in 1907
Summer events in the Isle of Man
Annual sporting events in the United Kingdom